Bistolida ursellus is a species of sea snail, a cowry, a marine gastropod mollusc in the family Cypraeidae, the cowries.

Subspecies and formae
 Bistolida ursellus amoeba (Schilder, F.A. & M. Schilder, 1938)

Description

Distribution
This species is found in the seas along the New Hebrides.

References

Cypraeidae
Gastropods described in 1791
Taxa named by Johann Friedrich Gmelin